Xilonen may refer to:

Chicomecōātl, the Aztec goddess of agriculture
Xilonen, the daily newspaper of the 1975 World Conference on Women